Jeffrey R. Di Leo is a Professor of English and Philosophy at the University of Houston–Victoria.  He is editor and founder of the critical theory journal symplokē, editor and publisher of the American Book Review, and Executive Director of the Society for Critical Exchange and its Winter Theory Institute.

Di Leo is a past member of the Modern Language Association Delegate Assembly (Teaching as Profession), and is the former president of the Society for Comparative Literature and the Arts.

He received a BA in Philosophy and Economics from Rutgers University, New Brunswick, and an MA in Philosophy, an MA in Comparative Literature, and a dual PhD in Philosophy and Comparative Literature from Indiana University, Bloomington. He has taught at Georgia Tech and the University of Illinois, Chicago.

Di Leo was born and raised in Vineland, New Jersey. He lives in Victoria, Texas with his wife, Nina, and their two sons.

Publications 
Books
•	The Bloomsbury Handbook of World Theory.  Co-edited with Christian Moraru. 
(2022)
•	Understanding Barthes, Understanding Modernism.  Co-edited with Zahi Zalloua. 
(2022)
•	Understanding Zizek, Understanding Modernism.  Co-edited with Zahi Zalloua. 
(2022)
•	Happiness.   
(2021)
•	Vinyl Theory.   
(2020)
•	Catastrophe and Higher Education: Neoliberalism, Theory, and the Future of the Humanities.   
(2020)•	What's Wrong with Anti-Theory?  Edited with an introductory essay.   
(2020)
•	Biotheory: Life and Death under Capitalism.  Co-edited with Peter Hitchcock. 
(2020)
•	Philosophy as World Literature. Edited with an introductory essay.   
(2020)
•	The End of American Literature: Essays from the Late Age of Print.  
(2019)
•	The Bloomsbury Handbook of Literary and Cultural Theory.  
(2019)
•	The Debt Age.  Co-edited with Peter Hitchcock and Sophia McClennen. 
(2018)
•	Experimental Literature: A Collection of Statements.  Co-edited with Warren Motte. 
(2018)
•	Higher Education under Late Capitalism: Identity, Conduct, and the Neoliberal Condition.  
(2017)
•	American Literature as World Literature.  Edited with an introductory essay. (2017)
•	Dead Theory: Derrida, Death, and the Afterlife of Theory.  Edited with an introductory essay. (2016)
•	The New Public Intellectual: Politics, Theory, and the Public Sphere.  Co-edited with Peter Hitchcock. 
(2016)
•	Corporate Humanities in Higher Education: Moving Beyond the Neoliberal Academy. 
(2014)
•	Criticism after Critique: Aesthetics, Literature, and the Political. Edited with an introductory
essay. 
(2014)
•	Turning the Page: Book Culture in the Digital Age. 
(2014)
•	Capital at the Brink: Overcoming the Destructive Legacies of Neoliberalism. 
Co-edited with Uppinder Mehan. (2013)
•	Neoliberalism, Education, Terrorism: Contemporary Dialogues.  Co-authored with Henry Giroux, Sophia McClennen, and Ken Saltman. (2013)•	Terror, Theory, and the Humanities. Co-edited with Uppinder Mehan. (2011)
•	Federman’s Fictions: Innovation, Theory, and the Holocaust. Edited with
an introductory essay. (2011)
•	Academe Degree Zero: Reconsidering the Politics of Higher Education.
(2010)
•	Fiction’s Present: Situating Contemporary Narrative Innovation.
Co-edited with R.M. Berry. (2008)
•	From Socrates to Cinema: An Introduction to Philosophy. (2007)
•	If Classrooms Matter: Progressive Visions of Educational Environments. 
Co-edited with Walter R. Jacobs. (2004)
•	On Anthologies: Politics and Pedagogy. Edited with an introductory
essay. (2004)
•	Affiliations: Identity in Academic Culture. Edited with an introductory
essay. (2003)
•	Morality Matters: Race, Class and Gender in Applied Ethics. (2002)

Selected Articles
•	“Adorno on Vinyl.” Understanding Adorno, Understanding Modernism. Ed. Robin Goodman (Bloomsbury, 2020)
•	“Self-Publishing: Transforming Ways of Writing and Reading.” World Authorship: Oxford Twenty-First Century Approaches to Literature. Ed. Tobias Boes, Rebecca Braun, and Emily Spiers (Oxford, 2020)•	“Late Capitalism on Vinyl: Neoliberalism, Biopolitics, and Music.” CR: The New Centennial Review. (2018)
•	“Philosophy without Apologies.” American Book Review. (2018)
•	“Independent Presses.” American Literature in Transition: 1990-2000. Ed. Stephen J. Burn (Cambridge, 2017)
•	“Don't Shoot the Journal Editor.” American Book Review. (2018)
•	“Running with the Pack: Why Theory Needs Community.” Intertexts. (2017)
•	“Digital Fatigue.” American Book Review. (2016)
•	“Who's Afraid of Self-Publishing?” Notre Dame Review. (2016)
•	“Bootleg Scholarship.” American Book Review. (2016)
•	“Higher Pleasure: In Defense of Academic Hedonism.” The Comparatist. (2015)•	“Is Higher Ed Working Class?” Rhizomes. (2014)
•	“Can Theory Save the Planet?: Critical Climate Change and the Limits of Theory.” symplokē.  (2013)
•	“Robots in the Stacks.” American Book Review. (2013)
•	“When University Presses Fail.” Inside Higher Ed.  (2012)
•	“The Executor’s Dilemma.” American Book Review. (2011)
•	“The Cult of the Book—and Why It Must End.” Chronicle of Higher
Education. (2010)
•	“In Praise of Tough Criticism.” Chronicle of Higher Education. (2010)
•	“Do Androids Dream of Anna Karenina?” American Book Review. (2010)
•	“The Fate of the Book Review.” Journal of Scholarly Publishing. (2009)
•	“Against Anonymity.” Inside Higher Ed. (2009)
•	“Public Intellectuals, Inc.” Inside Higher Ed. (2008)
•	“Policing the Borders of Birmingham: Cultural Studies, Semiotics and the
Politics of Repackaging Theory.” Semiotica. (2000)
•	“Text.” The Oxford Encyclopedia of Aesthetics. (1998)
•	“Charles Peirce’s Theory of Proper Names.” Studies in the Logic of
Charles Sanders Peirce. (1997)
•	“Unlimited Semiosis in Literature.” Southern Review. (1994)
•	“Peirce’s Haecceitism.” Transactions of the Charles S. Peirce Society.
(1991)

References

External links 
 

Year of birth missing (living people)
Living people
People from Vineland, New Jersey
People from Victoria, Texas
University of Houston–Victoria faculty